DYSEAC was the second Standards Electronic Automatic Computer. (See SEAC.)

DYSEAC was a first-generation computer built by the National Bureau of Standards for the U.S. Army Signal Corps. It was housed in a truck, making it one of the first movable computers (perhaps the first). It went into operation in April 1954.

DYSEAC used 900 vacuum tubes and 24,500 crystal diodes. It had a memory of 512 words of 45 bits each (plus 1 parity bit), using mercury delay-line memory. Memory access time was 48–384 microseconds. The addition time was 48 microseconds, and the multiplication/division time was 2112 microseconds. These times are excluding the memory-access time, which added up to approximately 1500 microseconds to those times.

See also
 SEAC
 List of vacuum-tube computers

References

External links
 BRL report on computers, inc. DYSEAC
 Astin, A. V. (1955), Computer Development (SEAC and DYSEAC) at the National Bureau of Standards, Washington D.C., National Bureau of Standards Circular 551, Issued January 25, 1955, U.S. Government Printing Office. Fully viewable online. Includes several papers describing the technical details and operation of both DYSEAC and its predecessor SEAC, from which DYSEAC was derived. In particular, see "DYSEAC", by A. L. Leiner, S. N. Alexander, and R. P. Witt, on pp. 39–71, for an overview of DYSEAC and its differences from SEAC.

One-of-a-kind computers
Vacuum tube computers
Portable computers
Serial computers